Olivia Rogowska was the defending champion, but lost in the final to Zoe Hives, 6–4, 6–2.

Seeds

Draw

Finals

Top half

Bottom half

References
Main Draw

Canberra Tennis International - Singles
2018 in Australian tennis
2018